The Revised Organic Act of the Virgin Islands is a United States federal law that repealed and replaced the previous Organic Act of the Virgin Islands. It was passed on July 22, 1954 by the U.S. Congress to act as the basis for law in the United States Virgin Islands. Like other organic acts it functions as a constitution for a territory of the United States.

Provisions
The Revised Organic Act provides for:

A unicameral (single-body) legislature of 15 members, elected by the residents of the U.S. Virgin Islands. While this legislature largely creates the laws that govern the islands, the ultimate laws that govern are still those of the U.S. Congress, a body in which Virgin Islanders have no vote;
A court system with judges appointed by the governor;
A Bill of Rights.

References

United States federal territory and statehood legislation
1954 in law
United States federal immigration and nationality legislation